The Firewatcher's Daughter is the fifth studio album by Brandi Carlile, released on March 3, 2015 on ATO Records. The lead single, "The Eye", was released in December 2014. It was nominated for a Grammy Award for Best Americana Album at the 2016 awards.

Release and reception

In a preview of her new album before release, the Boston Globe wrote, "Whether The Firewatcher's Daughter continues the country-folk flirtation of 2012's Bear Creek, returns to the warm adult songcraft of The Story and Give Up the Ghost, or explores some other direction entirely, she's sure to bring emotional intelligence, thoughtful clarity, and, most importantly, the most arresting female voice in pop this side of Adele. I'm betting on her."

“We didn't make any demos. To me rock and roll isn't really a genre but more of recklessness or a risk," Carlile told NPR. "The more something gets ironed out and sure of itself, the less it begins to rock somehow. That is what I think rock and roll is ... and it's scary."

The preview track, "The Eye," for which a video was released prior to the album, is a front-porch acoustic. The review from NPR Music said, " 'The Eye' is exactly what it proclaims itself to be: a quiet breath in the midst of the album's glorious storm. Rooted in Carlile's love of both classic country and California pop, the song is the kind many other artists are going to want to cover. It will be hard to top the original, though; it so eloquently highlights the telepathic connection Carlile shares with her longtime bandmates. A favorite on recent tours, 'The Eye' is destined to become a centerpiece in Carlile's catalog."

The Current reviewing the album wrote, "I thought she leaned too adult-contemporary for my tastes. Boy, was I wrong! This might be her most rockin' album to date. The album starts like a house afire: Carlile totally nails the vocal on the gospel influenced "Wherever is Your Heart," and this one makes you realize just how good she is. When she sings, you're a believer. She'll have you singing along on the infectious "The Things I Regret". Maybe the biggest surprise on the album is "Mainstream Kid," which shows some grit! It's as badass as Carlile has ever sounded. If you had Brandi Carlile pegged as an adult-contemporary softie, you might try again. Brandi Carlile and the Hanseroth twins show that they aren't afraid to rock out. The Firewatcher's Daughter is a bold and welcome addition to her catalogue." USA Today wrote, "The Firewatcher's Daughter is an album with a big heart, one that responds with love, not fear."

Carlile got a nod in the Best Americana Album category for the 58th Annual Grammy Awards. This was her first nomination at the Grammys.

Track listing

Personnel
Brandi Carlile - acoustic guitar, electric guitar, keyboards, organ, percussion, piano, electric piano, lead vocals, background vocals
Catherine Carlile - background vocals
Brian Griffin - drums, percussion
Ryan Hadlock - handclapping, percussion, piano, stomping
Phil Hanseroth - bass guitar, drums, electric guitar, handclapping, percussion, stomping, ukulele, background vocals
Tim Hanseroth - bass guitar, electric guitar, handclapping, percussion, slide guitar, stomping, background vocals
Josh Neumann - cello, strings
Jay Kardong - pedal steel guitar
Mike McCready - electric guitar
Jerry Streeter - bell

Charts

References

2015 albums
Albums recorded at Bear Creek Studio
ATO Records albums
Brandi Carlile albums